Mallet Creek is a stream located entirely within Medina County, Ohio.

Mallet Creek was named for Dan Mallet, the first pioneer who settled there.

See also
List of rivers of Ohio

References

Rivers of Medina County, Ohio
Rivers of Ohio